Sara Shane, born Elaine Sterling, (May 18, 1928 – July 31, 2022) was an American actress, who starred in film and television during the Golden Age Era in the 1950s and early 1960s.

Acting career
Born Elaine Sterling, Shane secured a film contract with MGM and was featured in a few musicals (billed with her birth name). She "was dropped by the studio after six months." In 1953 she hired publicist Russell Birdwell, and began using the name Sara Shane ("inspired by the movie with the same name"). She secured a seven-year contract with Universal International pictures (UI), but after two films took a sabbatical, which at the time was predicted as likely being brief.

A 1953 newspaper article reported that Hedy Lamarr prompted Shane (described as Lamarr's "closest woman friend in recent years") to resume her career in film. Shane said of Lamarr, "She pushed me into a career again and got me out of my laziness." The article noted that Shane was "currently testing for the John Wayne picture, 'The High and the Mighty,' and the film version of 'Oklahoma.'" She returned to film and television work in 1955, most notably in the Clark Gable film The King and Four Queens.  Her last film, 1959’s Tarzan's Greatest Adventure, in which she portrayed Angie, is considered her most memorable performance.  She continued in television through 1964.

Among Shane's television appearances, she played the role of defendant Alyce Aitken in the 1961 Perry Mason episode, "The Case of the Envious Editor." She also played the role of Ethel Meridith in the Outer Limits TV series, Episode 8, Season 2, titled Wolf 359 which aired on November 7th, 1964.

Business ventures
Shane left acting in 1964 to go into business. As of 2018, she was a director of Hippocrates Health Centre in Queensland, Australia and an author. In 1974, she published a non-fiction novel, Zulma, about a Mexican pre-op trans woman's experiences in the La Mesa Prison, based on her visit to the prison and her meeting with a trans woman named Zulma. In 2000, she published Take Control of Your Health and Escape the Sickness Industry. In 2008 she wrote, produced, and co-presented (with narrator Tony Barry) a DVD documentary entitled "One Answer to Cancer" (2008). The first half of the DVD is about the dangers of the pharmaceutical drug Aldara. The rest of the movie promotes the alternative cancer treatment, black salve; including detailed instructions on how to make it and apply it yourself.

Personal life
Shane married William Hollingsworth, a "wealthy real estate tycoon," in 1949. They divorced in 1957. The couple had a son, Jamie. Shane died on July 31, 2022 at the age of 94 in Gold Coast, Australia.

Filmography

References

External links

 
 Interview with Elaine Hollingsworth
 biography at Glamour Girls of the Silver Screen

1928 births
2022 deaths
20th-century American actresses
Actresses from St. Louis
American film actresses
American television actresses
American women writers
Metro-Goldwyn-Mayer contract players
21st-century American women
Deaths in Australia